Homi J.H. Taleyarkhan (1912 - 27 June 1998) was a Gandhian, Congress politician and a former Governor of Sikkim.

Before his gubernatorial posting, Taleyarkhan had served as a Minister of Housing and Civil Supplies of the Government of Maharashtra and as India's Ambassador to Libya.

Taleyarkhan served as the second Governor of Sikkim from 9 January 1981 to 17 June 1984. As governor, he persuaded the then Chief Minister Nar Bahadur Bhandari to merge his Sikkim Janata Parishad with the Indian National Congress but their relationship later soured.

A member of the Parsi community, he served as a member of the National Minorities Commission of India after his gubernatorial assignment from 1985 - 1990.  He was awarded the Padma Bhushan in 1991. He was a prolific writer, especially on Gandhi and Gandhism. Some of his books include From Warfare to Welfare: The Ideal of National Integration and the Splendor of Sikkim.

Homi J.H. Taleyarkhan: a man of devotion, dedication, and commitment is his biography by Sheshrao Chavan. He was married to Thrity Homi Taleyarkhan, a social activist and a former president of the Maharashtra State Women’s Council. The Homi J. H. Taleyarkhan Memorial Hospital and the Homi J. H. Taleyarkhan Memorial Hall in Mumbai have been named in his honour.

Books
 Cricket: United india in Australia , Thacker , 1947
 In the Land of the Blue Hills : A Visitor's Book to Ooty , 1951
 Roads to Beauty around Bombay , Published by Popular Book Depot, Bombay, 1953
 Aspects of Buddhism , Published by Vision Books, India, 1957
 khandala, Lonavla and Environments , Published by Lonavla Borough Municipality, Lonavla , 1958
 Splendour of Sikkim , 1982
 From Warfare to Welfare : The Ideal of National Integration , Bhartiya Vidya Bhavan , 1993
 Escape from the City
 Resort of Tomorrow
 Japan Today
 Cheers and Tears of Village Life
 Hill Stations of Western and South India

References 

Governors of Sikkim
Gandhians
Parsi people from Mumbai
1912 births
1988 deaths
Ambassadors of India to Libya
Indian National Congress politicians from Maharashtra
Politicians from Mumbai
Recipients of the Padma Shri in public affairs
Writers from Mumbai
20th-century Indian biographers
Indian political writers